Nordstranda Chapel is a chapel of the Church of Norway in Gildeskål Municipality in Nordland county, Norway. It is located in the village of Lekanger on the west side of the island of Sandhornøya. It is an annex chapel in the Gildeskål parish which is part of the Bodø domprosti (deanery) in the Diocese of Sør-Hålogaland. The white, wooden chapel was built in a long church style in 1963 using plans drawn up by the architect Kirsten Wleügel Knutssøn. The chapel seats about 160 people.

See also
List of churches in Sør-Hålogaland

References

Gildeskål
Churches in Nordland
Wooden churches in Norway
20th-century Church of Norway church buildings
Churches completed in 1963
1963 establishments in Norway
Long churches in Norway